Black and White and Blue: Adult Cinema from the Victorian Age to the VCR is a 2007 book about the history of erotic films by Dave Thompson. It was published by ECW Press.

Reception
The book received favorable reviews and was described as a "highly readable account" by Tucson Citizen.

References

2007 non-fiction books
Non-fiction books about pornography
Books about film
History of film